The 1993–94 Roller Hockey Champions Cup was the 30th edition of the Roller Hockey Champions Cup organized by CERH.

Igualada won their second consecutive title.

Teams
The champions of the main European leagues and Igualada, as title holder, played this competition, consisting in a double-legged knockout tournament.

Bracket

Source:

References

External links
 CERH website

1993 in roller hockey
1994 in roller hockey
Rink Hockey Euroleague